Rallye Sanremo is a rally competition held in Sanremo, Italy. Except for the 1995 event, the event was part of the FIA World Rally Championship schedule from the 1973 season to the 2003 season. Currently, it is a round of the Intercontinental Rally Challenge and the Italian national rally championship.

History

The first "Rallye Internazionale di Sanremo" was held in 1928. The rally name's French word "rallye", as opposed to Italian "rally", was inspired by Rallye Automobile Monte Carlo. After another successful rally in 1929, the event was given to new organisers who decided to set up a street race through the town of Sanremo instead. The first one, 1° Circuito Automobilistico Sanremo, was held in 1937 and won by Achille Varzi. Rallye Sanremo was restarted in 1961 as Rallye dei Fiori ("Rally of the Flowers") and has been held every year since.

From 1970 to 1972, Rallye Sanremo was part of the International Championship for Manufacturers. From 1973 to 2003, the rally was on the World Rally Championship schedule, except for 1995 when the event was only part of the FIA 2-Litre World Championship for Manufacturers. The rally became the centre of controversy in 1986 after the stewards disqualified the factory Peugeot team at the end of the third day for using illegal side skirts, handing the victory to Lancia. Peugeot had used the same configuration in earlier rallies without any scrutineering problems and had also passed pre-rally scrutineering. Peugeot appealed but the organisers did not allow the team to continue the rally. FIA later confirmed that the exclusion had been illegal as the Peugeot cars were legal, and decided to annul the results of the whole event.

Rallye Sanremo was originally a mixed surface event (tarmac and gravel) but from 1997 on it was organised as an all-tarmac rally. After being dropped from the WRC schedule (in favor of Rally di Sardegna in 2004), Rallye Sanremo has been part of the Italian Rally Championship. Since 2006, it has also been a round of the Intercontinental Rally Challenge. In 2015 the organizers and FIA decided to include Rallye Femminile Perla di Sanremo (from 1952 to 1956) as a part of Rallye Sanremo. The purpose for this decision was to honor Women's Italian Rally Series driven in Sanremo in the 1950s. Due to these changes 57° Rallye Sanremo in 2015 turned into 62° Rallye Sanremo and will continue with this numbering system.

Winners

 FIA later annulled the results of the 1986 event.
 In 2015 the organizers and FIA included Rallye Femminile Perla (from 1952 to 1956) di Sanremo as a part of Rallye Sanremo and changed the numbering system from 57° to 62°.

Multiple winners

References

External links
 Official website
 Rallye Sanremo at eWRC-results

 
Sport in Liguria
Sanremo
Sanremo
Recurring sporting events established in 1928
Sanremo
1928 establishments in Italy